United Nations Security Council Resolution 457, adopted unanimously on 4 December 1979, addressed the ongoing Iran hostage crisis. After expressing concern at the level of tensions between Iran and the United States as a potential threat to international security, the Council called on Iran to immediately release hostages held at the American embassy in Tehran and allow them to leave the country. The resolution reminded all Member States to respect the Vienna Convention on Diplomatic Relations and Vienna Convention on Consular Relations, which urged countries to respect the inviolability of diplomatic personnel and the premises of their diplomatic missions.

The Council then called on both countries to settle the disputes between them and exercise utmost restraint in the prevailing situation.

See also
 Iranian Revolution
 Iran – United States relations
 List of United Nations Security Council Resolutions 401 to 500 (1976–1982)
 United Nations Security Council Resolution 461

References
Text of the Resolution at undocs.org

External links
 

 0457
History of the Islamic Republic of Iran
1979 in the United States
Iran–United States relations
1979 in Iran
Iranian Revolution
 0457
 0457
Iran hostage crisis
December 1979 events